Further Education Funding Council may refer to:
 Further Education Funding Council for England
Further Education Funding Council for Wales